Cortland County is a county located in the U.S. state of New York. As of the 2020 census, the population of Cortland County was 46,809. The county seat is Cortland. The county is named after Pierre Van Cortlandt, president of the convention at Kingston that wrote the first New York State Constitution in 1777, and first lieutenant governor of the state.

Cortland County comprises the Cortland, NY Micropolitan Statistical Area, which is also included in the Ithaca-Cortland, NY Combined Statistical Area.

The Cortland apple is named for the county.

History

Early history
Located in the glaciated Appalachian Plateau area of Central New York, midway between Syracuse and Binghamton, this predominantly rural county is the southeastern gateway to the Finger Lakes Region. Scattered archaeological evidence indicates the Iroquois also known as the Haudenosaunee controlled the area beginning about AD 1500.

What was to become Cortland County remained within Indian territory until the American Revolution. It became part of the Military Tract, when, in 1781, more than 1¼ million acres (5,100 km2) were set aside by the State's Legislature to compensate two regiments formed to protect the State's western section from the English and their Iroquois allies, at the close of the Revolution.  To encourage settlement in the upstate isolated wilderness, the State constructed a road from Oxford through Cortland County to Cayuga Lake in 1792–94. This, and construction of privately financed roads, were the major impetus to settlement.

When counties were established in New York in 1683, the present Cortland County was part of Albany County, which encompassed the northern part of New York and all of the present State of Vermont, as well as indeterminate territory to west. On March 12, 1772, present day Cortland County became part of Tryon County, named for William Tryon, colonial governor of New York. In 1784, following the peace treaty that ended the American Revolutionary War, the name of the county was changed to honor General Richard Montgomery, who had captured several places in Canada and died attempting to capture the city of Quebec, thus replacing the name of the locally unpopular British governor. Present day Cortland County became part of Herkimer County in 1791, then became a part of Onondaga County when it split from Herkimer in 1794. Cortland County was formed by the splitting of Onondaga County in 1808.

Settlement of the county
Eastern New Yorkers and New Englanders, wanting new land to farm, welcomed the opening of this frontier. The first white settlement in the county was made in 1791 by Amos Todd, Joseph Beebe and Rhoda Todd Beebe, emigrants from Connecticut who paddled up the Tioughnioga River from Windsor, to live near the head of navigation in the Town of Homer. Following them came a flood of settlers who, in 1808, petitioned the State Legislature for county status. Thus, Cortland County was created from the southern half of Onondaga County as part of the Boston Ten Towns on April 8, 1808, and was named in honor of the Pierre Van Cortlandt family - Pierre, Sr. having been the first lieutenant governor of the state.

Nineteenth century

The 76th New York Volunteer Infantry was one of the most famous of the New York units in the Civil War. It was raised in 1861 primarily from Cortland County and the surrounding areas (about a third of the men were from the Cherry Valley area). The 76th was in most of the major battles the Army of the Potomac fought from Second Bull Run through Petersburg, at which time the three-year enlistment of most of the men ran out and the 300 or so men remaining from the 1,100 who left Cortland either returned home or transferred to other units.

At the Battle of Gettysburg, the 76th New York was one of the first infantry regiments on the field, holding down the extreme right of the Union line on the first day. The regiment took huge casualties in that battle - nearly one-third of its strength - including its commander Major Andrew J. Grover, the first infantry officer killed in the battle.

Modern Cortland County
Today, Cortland county is noted for the production of CNC milling machines, hospitality supplies, medical instruments and components, textiles, electronic components, plastic consumer goods, components for NASA, and a variety of other goods and services. International exporting is an integral part of many of the corporations in the area.

The county's present reflects its past. Agribusiness flourishes, yet consistent with the pattern elsewhere in New York State, the number of farms has declined while farm size and yield have increased. Continued growth in the service and light industry sectors is contributing to the growing strength of the Central New York region and the Southern Tier region.

The loss of many of its local businesses has led to the current economic decline of the region. Cornell University, Syracuse University, Binghamton University, and Ithaca College are all within a 45-minute drive of the City of Cortland. The State University of New York College at Cortland and Tompkins Cortland Community College are located in the county.

Government and politics

|}

Cortland County is a bellwether county, having voted for the national winner in every presidential election from 1976 to 2016.  The city of Cortland itself, the largest city in the county, leans Democratic.

Republican Ronald Reagan scored landslide wins in the county in 1980 and 1984. Democrat Bill Clinton carried the county with pluralities in 1992 and 1996. Republican George W. Bush carried the county in 2000 and 2004, defeating Al Gore by less than 1% in 2000, and John Kerry by just over 4% in 2004. In 2008, Barack Obama defeated John McCain 54-45%, and in 2012 he defeated Mitt Romney by a similar margin. The last Democrat to win a majority in Cortland County prior to Obama was Lyndon Johnson in 1964.

In 2020, Cortland County's streak of voting for the winner ended, as Donald Trump won for the second time, defeating Democratic nominee Joe Biden by a narrow margin of just 420 votes. Had the streak continued, it would have been tied with Clallam County, Washington for the longest active streak in the nation, as the streaks of longstanding bellwethers Valencia County, New Mexico and Vigo County, Indiana also ended in 2020. Cortland was one of five counties in the state that Trump carried by less than 500 votes.

Cortland County's lawmaking body is the legislature, which consists of 17 members. All are elected from single member districts.

Geography

Cortland County is sometimes considered to be part of Central New York and  Southern Tier regions of New York and is also somewhat to the southwest of the center of New York, south of Syracuse and north of Binghamton.

Adjacent counties
 Onondaga County - north
 Madison County - northeast
 Chenango County - east
 Broome County - south
 Tompkins County - west
 Tioga County - southwest
 Cayuga County - northwest

Major highways
  Interstate 81
  U.S. Route 11
  New York State Route 13
  New York State Route 41
  New York State Route 90
  New York State Route 392

Demographics

2020 Census

2000 census
As of the census of 2000, there were 48,599 people, 18,210 households, and 11,617 families residing in the county. The population density was 97 people per square mile (38/km2). There were 20,116 housing units at an average density of 40 per square mile (16/km2). The racial makeup of the county was 96.95% White, 0.86% Black or African American, 0.27% Native American, 0.41% Asian, 0.01% Pacific Islander, 0.32% from other races, and 1.18% from two or more races. 1.16% of the population were Hispanic or Latino of any race. 17.3% were of English, 16.9% Irish, 14.2% German, 13.0% Italian and 9.9% American ancestry according to Census 2000. 96.0% spoke English and 1.4% Spanish as their first language.

There were 18,210 households, out of which 31.00% had children under the age of 18 living with them, 49.20% were married couples living together, 10.30% had a female householder with no husband present, and 36.20% were non-families. 26.50% of all households were made up of individuals, and 10.40% had someone living alone who was 65 years of age or older. The average household size was 2.50 and the average family size was 3.00.

In the county, the population was spread out, with 23.70% under the age of 18, 15.50% from 18 to 24, 26.50% from 25 to 44, 21.80% from 45 to 64, and 12.50% who were 65 years of age or older. The median age was 34 years. For every 100 females there were 93.50 males. For every 100 females age 18 and over, there were 90.00 males.

The median income for a household in the county was $34,364, and the median income for a family was $42,204. Males had a median income of $30,814 versus $22,166 for females. The per capita income for the county was $16,622. About 9.30% of families and 15.50% of the population were below the poverty line, including 16.40% of those under age 18 and 10.80% of those age 65 or over.

As of 2014 the largest self-reported ancestry groups in Cortland County, New York were:
 English - 17.7%
 Irish - 12.9%
 German - 11.9%
 Italian - 8.8%
 "American" - 6.9%
 French (except Basque) - 2.8%
 Dutch - 2.7%
 Polish - 2.2%
 Scottish - 2.1%

As of 2015 the largest self-reported ancestry groups in Cortland County, New York were:
 English - 18.8%
 Irish - 12.3%
 German - 10.8%
 Italian - 8.1%
 "American" - 7.3%
 Dutch - 2.5%
 Scottish - 2.3%
 French (except Basque) - 2.2%
 Polish - 2.1%

As of 2016 the largest self-reported ancestry groups in Cortland County, New York were:
 English - 19.8%
 Irish - 11.9%
 German - 10.2%
 Italian - 8.0%
 "American" - 6.9%
 Dutch - 2.4%
 Scottish - 2.0%
 French (except Basque) - 2.3%
 Polish - 2.1%

Education
Area schools include:
 State University of New York at Cortland
 Tompkins Cortland Community College
 Cincinnatus Central School District
 Cortland City School District
 Homer Central School District
 Marathon Central School District
 McGraw Central School District

Communities

Larger settlements

Towns

 Cincinnatus
 Cortlandville
 Cuyler
 Freetown
 Harford
 Homer
 Lapeer
 Marathon
 Preble
 Scott
 Solon
 Taylor
 Truxton
 Virgil
 Willet

Notable people
 William Dillon, composer, lyricist, and vaudevillian
 Ronnie James Dio, former frontman for Rainbow and Black Sabbath; a street in the city of Cortland is named for him (Dio Way)
 Nancy Duffy, Syracuse news personality; founder of the Syracuse St. Patrick's Day Parade
 John McGraw, Hall of Fame Major League Baseball player and manager from the town of Truxton
 Alton B. Parker, Democratic candidate for president in 1904
 Arthur C. Sidman, playwright and vaudevillian
 Elmer Ambrose Sperry, prolific inventor who invented gyroscopic compass and held over 400 patents; the USS Sperry is  named after him

See also

 List of counties in New York
 National Register of Historic Places listings in Cortland County, New York
 Svend O. Heiberg Memorial Forest

References

Further reading

External links 
 
 Weather forecast for Cortland County
 
 Cortland County Economic Development
 Cortland County Chamber of Commerce
 Cortland County Convention & Visitors Bureau
  Early history of Cortland County and its towns 
 Cortland County Historical Aerial Photographs of New York , Cornell University Library & Cornell Institute for Resource Information Sciences
 Cortland Public History 

 
1808 establishments in New York (state)
Populated places established in 1808
Counties of Appalachia